This is a list of the National Register of Historic Places listings in McCulloch County, Texas.

This is intended to be a complete list of properties listed on the National Register of Historic Places in McCulloch County, Texas. There are two properties listed on the National Register in the county. One is a State Antiquities Landmark while both are Recorded Texas Historic Landmarks.

Current listings

The locations of National Register properties may be seen in a mapping service provided.

|}

See also

National Register of Historic Places listings in Texas
Recorded Texas Historic Landmarks in McCulloch County

References

External links

McCulloch County, Texas
McCulloch County
Buildings and structures in McCulloch County, Texas